Nyhavn 20 is a 17th-century building overlooking the Nyhavn canal in central Copenhagen, Denmark. It was listed in the Danish registry of protected buildings and places in 1945. The building houses a bar in the basement and a residential apartment on the upper floors. The facade features a relief of a fish above the main entrance, flanked by two reliefs of sailing ships.

History

18th century

The property was listed in Copenhagen's first cadastre of 1689 as No. 10 in St. Ann's East Quarter. It was owned by skipper Peder Jensen at that time. The current building on the site was constructed between 1723 and 1733. The house was then a two-storey building with a facade crowned by a gabled wall dormer, remniscient of the one stil seen at present-day Nyhavn 9. It was separated from No. 9 (now Nyhavn 27) by a small alley leading to a small undeveloped area.

In the winter of 175253, No, 10 was acquired for 2,450 Danish rigsdaler by first mate (overstyrmand) in the Danish Asiatic Company Lars Swane. He was married to Johanne Marie Harboe (since 31 July 1848) and the couple had three children. He had for some time owned a 50 % share of No. 11 (now Nyhavn 31). The other half of No. 11 was then owned by one Peder Pedersen Løg's widow. Swane's new property was listed in the new cadastre of 1756 as No. 15 in St. Ann's East Quarter. He and his family did not move to their new property until after he was appointed as captain of the ship Dronning Sophie Magdalena on an expedition to Tranquebar in 1767. Swane sailed from Copenhagen in December 1757, bound for Tranquebar. The ship arrived back in Copenhagen in  May 1759. He captained his second DAC expedition, this time to Canton, from January 1761 until July 1762. His wife ran a tea and porcelain shop with his personal home-bringings until 1760. In the winter of 176263, Swane sold the property for 3,300 Danish rigsdaler. Their next home was a third-floor apartment at Store Kongensgade No. 44 (now Store Kongensgade 45). In early 1764, while Swane was on a new expedition to Canton, his wife purchased No. 12 in Strand Quarter (now Gammel Strand 42).

The property was home to 12 residents in three households at the time of the 1787 census. Peter Rose, a commissioner, resided in the building with his wife Karen Møller, their 10-year-old foster son 
Jacob Eyberg, a 16-year-old girl from the Poor Authority in their care and one maid. Henrich Schalckam, a skipper, resided in the building with his wife Anna, one maid and the mate Thyge Knudsen (lodger). Rasmus Petersen, a workman, resided in the building with his wife Maria Povls Datter and their son Peter.

19th century
The property was again home to three households at the 1801 census. Anne Cathrine Erichsen (née Cramer), a widow, resided in the building with her two children (aged 15 and 19) and skipper Peter Jensen. P. Lorentzen, a skipper, resided in the building with the mate Rasmus Knudsen	and the widow Martha Kirchhof. Ole Johansen Malm, a barkeeper, resided in the building with his wife Karen Andersdatter, their two-year-old daughter and one maid. Frederik Tietgen, a senior clerk, resided in the building with his wife Ane Krog, their three children (aged one to eight), his suster-in-law Juliane Marie Krog and one maid.

The property was again  listed in the new cadastre of 1806 as No. 15. It was owned by J. Eriksen's widow at that time.

The property was home to three households at the 1834 census. Niels Hansen, a stableman for Prince Christian, resided on the ground floor with his wife Hanne Wallerød, their four children (aged two to 10) and one maid. Ludvig Fredrik Pedersen, a servant, resided on the first floor with his wife Louise Hiksop, their one-year-old son Leon Ferdinan Pedersen	and three lodgers. Christian Jeremias Biermann, a military surgeon at the Oldenburg Infantry Regiment in Rensburg, resided on the second floor with his wife Hans Johnsen, a workman and two seamstresses. Peter Ervaldsen Stolberg, a barkeeper, resided in the basement with his wife Elisabet Schjarlotte Norop, 	their three children (aged 10 to 18) and one maid.

The property was home to three households at the 1840 census. Peter Evalsen Staalberg, a barkeeper, resided in the building with his wife Elisabeth Carlotte Knusen and the wife's 16-year-old step brother Knud Julius Butzbach. Nicolai Meier Bruhn, a workman, resided on the first floor with his wife Johane Christine Mathiesen, their four-year-old stepson  Frederik Ferdinant Mathiesen and two lodgers. Søren Rasmussen, another workman, resided on the second floor with his wife Marie Amalie Bodenbak, their three-year-old daughter Ane Christine Bodenbak and one lodger. Frederik Eisinger, a smith, resided in the basement with his wife Ane Margrethe Ohlsen, their one-year-old son Volfgan Eisinger, his mother Marie Eisinger and two lodgers (shoemaker and his nine-year-old son).

The property was again home to 27 residents in five households at the 1850 census. Mette Olsdatter, a widow and the owner of the building, resided on the ground floor with her son 
Christian Theodor Madsen and three lodgers. Christian Bach, a master tailor, resided on the first floor with his wife Christiane Bach (née Hansen), their two children (aged four and six) and an apprentice.. Rwo widows, two unmarried women and one of the widow's brother were also residing on the first floor. Anton Severin Trankjær, a master shoemaker, resided on the second floor with his wife Marie Elisabet Larsen and their one-year-old son. Anton Peter Zvinge, a barkeeper, resided in the basement with his wife Anne Malthea Nielsen, their six children (aged three to 21) and one lodger (sailor).

 
The property was home to 18 residents in four households at the 1860 census. Jacob Hacobsen, a barkeeper, resided in the building with his wife Ane Sophie Jacobsen, one maid and the sailor Johannes Lembke. Mette Madsen, a widow, resided in the building with her three son Christian Theodor Madsen, her two granddaughters (aged eight and 13), one maid and two lodgers. Peter Christensen, a workman, resided in the building with his wife Karen Marie Christensen and two lodgers. Christian Chrunich, a sailor, resided in the building with his wife Sophie Frederikke Chrunich and their six-year-old foster daughter 	Sopie Frederikke Bænsen.

The building was heightened with one storey in 1866. A hotel was for a while operated as a hotel under the name et Stadt Flensborg.

20th century
The building was renovated by the architect Jørgen Thomsen in 1982- Ot 1093, it received an award from the City of Copenhagen.

Architecture

Nyhavn 29 is constructed in brick on a stone plinth with three storeys over a walk-out basement. The four-bays-wide facade is plastered and painted in a pale red colour. It is decorated with five carved, green-painted wooden panels on the ground floor and a white-painted cornice below the roof. Five wall anchors are seen below the windows of the first and second floor. The main entrance in the bay furthest to the left is topped by a transom window. It is reached via a flight of stone steps. The basement entrance is located in the second bay from the right. It is topped by a relief of a fish. It is flanked by two reliefs of   sailing ship. The pitched, red tile roof features two dormer windows towards the street and one towards the yard. A two-storey, half-timbered side wing with a first-storey Cantilever extends from the rear side of the building along the east side of a narrow courtyard. The timber framing of the upper floor forms an open gallery. The side wing is topped by a monopitched red tile roof. A red painted door is located in the fourth bay from the north.

Today

The building is today owned by  Krystyna Anna Irena Cegielski. Fiskens Pyb, a bar, occupies the basement of the building. The ground floor is now part of Skipperkroen at Nyhavn 27. A single apartment is located on the upper floors.

Gallery

References

External links

 Steggensen 1829

Listed residential buildings in Copenhagen